Blennidus leleuporum is a species of ground beetle in the subfamily Pterostichinae. It was described by Reichardt in 1976.

References

Blennidus
Beetles described in 1976